Macadamia ternifolia (common names: small-fruited Queensland nut, gympie nut) is a tree in the flowering plant family Proteaceae, native to Queensland in Australia, and is listed as vulnerable under the EPBC Act.

Macadamia ternifolia is a small multi-stemmed tree which grows up to 8 m tall. The narrowly ovate adult leaves are in whorls of three on a stalk which is 4–10 mm long.  Each leaf is 9–12.5 cm long, 2–3.5 cm wide and is dull above and paler below. They are stiff, smooth and leathery, with slightly undulating margins and points at the tip. The midrib is prominent below, and slightly sunken above. Conflorescence is simple on a stem 5–18 cm long, with pink tepals 6–8.5 mm long, and filaments 4–7 mm long which are joined to thetepals for 0.5–6 mm and anthers 1–2 mm long. The ovaries 0.4–1 mm long and the style 5–10 mm long, and give rise to fruit which is 14–22 mm long and 13–22 mm wide. The seeds are globose to broadly ovoid and about 16 mm long and 12 mm wide and have a smooth shell about 1 mm thick.

See also
Macadamia nuts

References

External links

ternifolia
Bushfood
Edible nuts and seeds
Crops originating from Australia
Flora of Queensland
Proteales of Australia
Trees of Australia
Taxa named by Ferdinand von Mueller
Plants described in 1857